Funny Looking Angels is a collaborative Christmas album recorded by Smith & Burrows, a band made up of English musicians Tom Smith (Editors) and Andy Burrows (I Am Arrows, Razorlight, ex-We Are Scientists). It was released on 25 November 2011 through Kitchenware Records.

The album contains four covers: "Only You" by Yazoo, Black's "Wonderful Life", "Funny Looking Angels" by Delta, and "On and On" by Longpigs.

Promotion
"Funny Looking Angels" was released as the lead single to promote the album.

The second single, "When the Thames Froze", was released on 12 December 2011. It has peaked at number 32 on the UK Indie Chart, and entered national charts in Belgium and the Netherlands.

Critical reception

Funny Looking Angels received generally favourable reviews from music critics. At Metacritic, which assigns a normalized rating out of 100 to reviews from mainstream critics, the album received an average score of 63, based on 9 reviews.

Track listing

Charts

References

External links

2011 Christmas albums
Christmas albums by English artists
Kitchenware Records albums